Danielle Sari Haim (born February 16, 1989) is an American musician. She is the lead guitarist and vocalist of the pop rock band Haim, which also consists of her two sisters, Este Haim and Alana Haim. Danielle also serves as the group's drummer in the studio, while they retain a separate drummer for most of their live performances.

Early life 
Danielle Sari Haim was born and raised in the San Fernando Valley, California to a Jewish family. Her Israeli-born father Mordechai ("Moti") and her mother Donna were both musical; though he had been a professional soccer player in Israel, Moti also played drums, while Donna won a contest on The Gong Show in the 1970s singing a Bonnie Raitt song. While Danielle showed an aptitude for the guitar at a young age, Moti made the decision that Este would be more suited to the bass, buying her a second hand Fender for $50.

Career

Early career 
Danielle started playing music at an early age, and was encouraged by her parents to pursue the guitar. As a child, she played lead guitar in a band called Rockinhaim which consisted of her parents and her two sisters. The band played mostly classic rock covers. After playing a gig with their parents, Danielle and her older sister Este were asked to join a pop group called the Valli Girls, and signed to Sony Records in 2004. Danielle also received a product endorsement deal from Gibson guitars. While later stating that this group was not a suitable outlet for the kind of music she wanted to be playing, the band did allow Danielle some commercial success. The group made promotional videos, an unreleased album, and their song "Always There in You" was featured on the soundtrack of The Sisterhood of the Traveling Pants in 2005.

Before forming a band with her sisters, Danielle toured with Jenny Lewis (2009 on guitar), and Julian Casablancas (2009–10 on percussion and guitar), and played guitar briefly for CeeLo Green in June 2010. She was introduced to Jenny Lewis by a friend of Jenny's who invited Danielle and Este to a jam session/party at Lewis' house on July 4, 2008. Lewis saw Danielle's performance on drums, and later asked her to tour with her as a guitarist. Julian Casablancas also saw Danielle perform on that tour, and asked her to be a part of his touring band, which went into rehearsals two days after wrapping Jenny Lewis's tour. Danielle appears in the official music video of Casablancas' song "11th Dimension". It was while on tour with other acts that Danielle realized she would much rather play on stage with her sisters. After two years of being on the road with other bands, Danielle came back to form a three-piece band with Este and Alana called Haim.

Haim 

In 2007, Danielle and her sisters formed a band of their own known as Haim. They released an EP called Forever in 2012, and appeared at many music festivals, which brought them to the attention of Jay-Z. They were later signed to Roc Nation, and were one of the featured artists at Jay Z's Made in America festival.

Haim released their first studio album titled Days Are Gone in September 2013. In July 2017, Haim's second studio album Something to Tell You was released to positive reviews. Haim's third studio album Women in Music Pt.III was released in June 2020 to widespread critical acclaim. The album received nominations for Album of the Year and Best Rock Performance at the 63rd Annual Grammy Awards in 2021.

Other collaborations 
In August 2014, Danielle joined the Killers as the drummer for one song during a concert in San Francisco. The Killers' lead singer Brandon Flowers told the crowd that "We have a cool, special surprise guest. ... One of the bands that came out and dropped a record on us in 2013 and gave us hope for people playing music was Haim. Danielle, the singer from Haim, is actually a hell of a drummer."

Personal life 
Danielle previously dated musician Blake Mills. She is in a relationship with producer Ariel Rechtshaid, who also produced all three of Haim's albums. The first single from Haim's third record, "Summer Girl", was written for Rechtshaid after he was diagnosed with cancer.

Artistry 
Danielle serves as Haim's lead vocalist and guitarist, although all three band members sing and play multiple instruments. Danielle also plays piano and drums, the latter of which she typically plays for the band's studio recordings. Vocally, Danielle is an alto, with Abby Johnston of The Austin Chronicle describing her vocal delivery as "understated". Reviewing Days Are Gone (2013), Heather Phares of AllMusic found Danielle's voice distinctive "Compared to the thin voices of so many 2010s pop stars", describing her as a "remarkably versatile" vocalist. The Pop Break contributor Jason Kundrath described Danielle as being "in full command of her low alto, stacking her syllables close together, and using each one percussively to create rhythmic hooks on top of her grade A melodies". Similarly, Spencer Kornhaber of The Atlantic observed that the artist "breaks words into a cluster of onomatopoeias delivered rapid-fire, making sentences sound like tongue twisters even without alliteration". When Danielle opted not to sing during a 2018 live performance upon contracting the flu, The Guardian music critic Kitty Empire found the absence of Danielle's vocals to be disorienting as a listener, opining that she "packs a gravitas her two sisters lack".

BBC music critic Mark Savage declared Danielle "the honorary Mick Jagger of Haim", drawing similarities between their musicianship, performance styles and physical appearance, which Savage attributes to her having toured with The Strokes band members Jenny Lewis and Julian Casablancas. Younger sister Alana likened her to rapper will.i.am because "She's always on some future sh*t". Aspects of Danielle's personal life and struggles were written into Haim's third album Women in Music Pt. III (2020), such as the depression she experienced post-tour and the cancer diagnosis of her boyfriend, producer Ariel Rechtshaid. Several interviewers and publications have cited Danielle as the quietest and most reserved among her siblings, with Melena Ryzik of The New York Times describing her as the band's "most precise and serious-minded" member. Danielle herself admitted to being a shy person who "come[s] out of my shell on stage", an observation corroborated by DIY's Emma Snook. Danielle has publicly condemned the sexism she and her sisters receive as female rock musicians, believing their musical efforts are often dismissed and ignored by the rock community because they "don't take ourselves too seriously, and we do choreography in our music videos".

Discography

Haim 
 Days Are Gone (2013)
 Something to Tell You (2017)
 Women in Music Pt. III (2020)

As featured artist

Filmography

Film

Music videos

References

External links 

 HAIM
 Instagram
 
 
 

1989 births
Living people
American singer-songwriters
Musicians from Los Angeles
Songwriters from California
American people of Israeli descent
Jewish American musicians
American women guitarists
Scarlet Fever (band) members
American contraltos
American women drummers